Gudrun Maria Abt (born 3 August 1962) is a retired German hurdler. She was born in Riedlingen.

Biography
At the 1988 Summer Olympics in Seoul she finished sixth in 400 m hurdles in a personal best time of 54.04 seconds. This ranks her fifth among German 400 m hurdlers, behind Sabine Busch, Cornelia Ullrich, Ellen Fiedler and Heike Meißner.

At the 1988 Olympics she also finished fourth in 4 × 400 m relay for West Germany together with Ute Thimm, Helga Arendt and Andrea Thomas. She had previously finished fifth at the 1987 World Championships with Ute Thimm, Helga Arendt and Gisela Kinzel. At the 1990 European Championships in Athletics in Split she finished fourth in 400 m hurdles.

Abt represented the sports club TSV Genkingen, and became West German champion in 1986, 1987 and 1988.

International competitions

References

External links

1962 births
Living people
People from Riedlingen
Sportspeople from Tübingen (region)
West German female hurdlers
Athletes (track and field) at the 1988 Summer Olympics
Olympic athletes of West Germany
World Athletics Championships athletes for West Germany
World Athletics Championships athletes for Germany